Five Creeks Township is a township in Clay County, Kansas, USA.  As of the 2000 census, its population was 159.

Geography
According to the USGS, it contains one cemetery, Shields.

The stream of Pinkerton Branch runs through this township.

References
 USGS Geographic Names Information System (GNIS)

External links
 US-Counties.com
 City-Data.com

Townships in Clay County, Kansas
Townships in Kansas